Bruce Alan Major (born January 3, 1967) is a Canadian-born American businessman and former National Hockey League player for the Quebec Nordiques.

Hockey career
Born in Vernon, British Columbia, Major was drafted by the Nordiques in the 1985 NHL Entry Draft with the 99th overall pick. However, he decided to play four years of college hockey for the University of Maine. After graduation he signed with the Nordiques, he spent most of his career in the minors but did play in four NHL games in 1990–91.

Business career
Major is a Certified Public Accountant who currently resides in Topsfield, Massachusetts.

In 2006, he and former Cognos salesman Joseph Lally formed a business partnership called Montvale Solutions, which resold Cognos software. Lally later pleaded guilty to having paid kickbacks to Speaker of the Massachusetts House of Representatives Salvatore DiMasi. Major testified under immunity for the prosecution in DiMasi's corruption trial. In his testimony, Major stated that he told Lally he believed that some of the money paid to business consultants Richard McDonough and Richard Vitale was going to back to DiMasi. Lally yelled at Major and told him "As far as you know, it's a payment to WN Advisors and that's it." He also testified that Lally "chastised" him for using DiMasi's name in an email and told him never to do it again. Major and Lally dissolved their partnership in late 2007.

References

External links
 

1967 births
Living people
Canadian ice hockey centres
Halifax Citadels players
Sportspeople from Vernon, British Columbia
Quebec Nordiques draft picks
Quebec Nordiques players
Ice hockey people from British Columbia